The 2014 NRL season was the 107th season of professional rugby league in Australia and the 17th season of the National Rugby League in Australia and New Zealand. The season started in New Zealand, for the Auckland Nines, replacing the Rugby League All Stars Match for the year, in the pre-season. After 26 rounds of the regular season, the Sydney Roosters were again crowned minor premiers and the competition had been reduced to a top eight teams to contest the finals series. The grand final was won by  the South Sydney Rabbitohs, ending a 43-year premiership drought, winning 30-6 against the Canterbury-Bankstown Bulldogs.

Teams

The lineup of teams remained unchanged for the 8th consecutive year. The 2014 season also presents a record 7 teams naming co-captains. The NRL's salary cap for the clubs' top 25 players was $A6.3M for 2014.

Pre-season

The 2014 pre-season featured the inaugural Auckland Nines competition, held over a weekend at Auckland's Eden Park. Hailed a success with its large attendances, the tournament was won by North Queensland Cowboys, claiming their first piece of silverware. The following weekend the 2014 World Club Challenge was played in Sydney, the first time the match was held outside England since 1994, with the Sydney Roosters defeating the Wigan Warriors convincingly.

Unlike previous seasons' advertising campaigns that featured a pop song, in 2014 the NRL's You're the difference was a spoken-word piece that focused on the game's fans. The NRL's official season launch was on 26 February at the Sydney Exhibition Centre and featured Roosters captain Anthony Minichiello speaking as the face of the game.

In the annual pre-season Charity Shield match, the Dragons hosted the Rabbitohs but were beaten.

Regular season

The regular season commenced on Thursday, 6 March in Sydney between the South Sydney Rabbitohs and the Sydney Roosters. A number of themed rounds featured in the 2014 season, including Men of League Heritage Round (round 5), Women in League Round (round 10), and Indigenous Round (round 23). In addition, the NRL chose to designate round 19 as 'Rise for Alex' round in order to allow the rugby league community to show their support for Newcastle Knights player Alex McKinnon, who suffered a severe neck injury in round 3. One dollar from each ticket sold across all eight games were donated to support McKinnon's recovery, where it raised over $147,000 in total.

For the first time in the code's 106-year history, not one player was sent off from the field during the regular season.

Bold – Opposition's Home game
X – Bye
Opponent for round listed above margin

Ladder

Ladder progression
Numbers highlighted in green indicate that the team finished the round inside the top 8.
Numbers highlighted in blue indicates the team finished first on the ladder in that round.
Numbers highlighted in red indicates the team finished last place on the ladder in that round.
Underlined numbers indicate that the team had a bye during that round.

Finals series

For the third year the NRL uses the finals system previously implemented by the ARL competition from the 1990s (also used as the AFL finals system) to decide the grand finalists from the top eight finishing teams. All but two teams retained a top-eight position to feature in this season's finals series. The Brisbane Broncos made a return after finishing 12th in 2013, whilst the Penrith Panthers made their first finals appearance since 2010 and only the second time since 2004.

By the time of the 2014 NRL Grand final list-determining preliminary finals, the top four finishing teams remained except for the 2nd-placed Sea Eagles, who'd been replaced by the 7th-placed Bulldogs.

† Match decided in golden point extra time.

Chart

Grand final

Regular season player statistics
The following statistics are of the conclusion of round 26.
 South Sydney's winger Lote Tuqiri was the oldest player in the 2014 NRL Season at the age of 35,  he is three days older than Parramatta's Fuifui Moimoi

Top 5 point scorers

Top 5 try scorers

Top 5 goal scorers

Top 5 tacklers

2014 Transfers

Players

Coaches

References